Alestopetersius leopoldianus is a species of African tetras found in Lake Mai Ndombe, the middle Congo River, lower Lomami and Wagenia Falls in the middle Congo River basin in the Democratic Republic of the Congo.

References

Paugy, D., 1984. Characidae. p. 140-183. In J. Daget, J.-P. Gosse and D.F.E. Thys van den Audenaerde (eds.) Check-list of the freshwater fishes of Africa (CLOFFA). ORSTOM, Paris and MRAC, Tervuren. Vol. 1.

Alestidae
Fish of Africa
Taxa named by George Albert Boulenger
Fish described in 1899